Hannah Louise Macleod,  (born 9 June 1984) is an English field hockey player.

Macleod began her youth career at St Ives Hockey Club, Cambridge, and rose up the ranks to play for their first team. She went on to play club hockey for St Albans, Leicester and Loughborough Students.

She made her international debut in 2003. She competed for the Great Britain at the 2012 Summer Olympics, helping the team win bronze.

In October 2012, the Olympic medals of Macleod and Alex Partridge were stolen along with their jackets during a night at Mahiki in London. The stolen medal was recovered when it was sent anonymously by mail to the headquarters of England Hockey.

In the 2016 Summer Olympics, Macleod played for the GB field hockey team again. The team won the gold medal.

References

External links 
 

 

1984 births
Living people
British female field hockey players
Field hockey players at the 2012 Summer Olympics
Olympic field hockey players of Great Britain
Olympic medalists in field hockey
Olympic bronze medallists for Great Britain
Olympic gold medallists for Great Britain
Medalists at the 2012 Summer Olympics
Medalists at the 2016 Summer Olympics
Alumni of Loughborough University
Loughborough Students field hockey players
Field hockey players at the 2016 Summer Olympics
People from Boston, Lincolnshire
Commonwealth Games medallists in field hockey
Commonwealth Games bronze medallists for England
Members of the Order of the British Empire
Field hockey players at the 2010 Commonwealth Games
Medallists at the 2010 Commonwealth Games